Wilder Park may refer to:

Wilder Park (Jacksonville, Florida)
Wilder Park, Louisville, Kentucky